2031 BAM, provisional designation , is a stony Florian asteroid from the inner regions of the asteroid belt, approximately 8 kilometers in diameter. It was discovered on 8 October 1969, by Soviet astronomer Lyudmila Chernykh at the Crimean Astrophysical Observatory in Nauchnyj, on the Crimean peninsula. The asteroid was named for those who built the Baikal–Amur Mainline (BAM; БАМ), a Siberian railway line.

Orbit and classification 

BAM is a member of the Flora family, a giant asteroid family and the largest family of stony asteroids in the main belt. It orbits the Sun in the inner asteroid belt at a distance of 1.8–2.6 AU once every 3 years and 4 months (1,220 days; semi-major axis of 2.23 AU). Its orbit has an eccentricity of 0.17 and an inclination of 5° with respect to the ecliptic.

Physical characteristics 

BAM has been characterized as a stony S-type asteroid by Pan-STARRS photometric survey.

Rotation period 

In October 2016, a rotational lightcurve of BAM was obtained from photometric observations by amateur astronomer Matthieu Conjat. Lightcurve analysis gave a well-defined rotation period of 10.774 hours with a brightness amplitude of 0.15 magnitude.

Diameter and albedo 

According to the survey carried out by the Japanese Akari satellite, BAM measures 8.14 kilometers in diameter and its surface has an albedo of 0.170. The Collaborative Asteroid Lightcurve Link assumes a standard albedo of 0.24 – derived from 8 Flora, the parent body of the Flora family – and calculates a diameter of 7.14 kilometers based on an absolute magnitude of 12.9.

Naming 

This minor planet was named after those who constructed the Baikal–Amur Mainline (BAM; БАМ) through eastern Russia from 1974 to 1986. The rail line opened in 1989, and runs between Ust-Kut (near Lake Baikal and Komsomolsk-on-Amur. The official  was published by the Minor Planet Center on 1 September 1978.

References

External links 
 Asteroid Lightcurve Database (LCDB), query form (info )
 Dictionary of Minor Planet Names, Google books
 Asteroids and comets rotation curves, CdR – Observatoire de Genève, Raoul Behrend
 Discovery Circumstances: Numbered Minor Planets (1)-(5000) – Minor Planet Center
 
 

002031
Discoveries by Lyudmila Chernykh
Named minor planets
19691008